Jessica Oughton (born 7 November 1988) is a British female canoeist who won at senior level the Wildwater Canoeing World Championships.

Medals at the World Championships
Oughton won five medals at senior level at the Wildwater Canoeing World Championships.
Senior

References

External links
 Jessica Oughton at Wildwater Racing 

1988 births
Living people
British female canoeists
Place of birth missing (living people)